Mukul Banerjee ( Mukherjee; 7 December 1925 – ) was an Indian politician. She was elected to the Lok Sabha, lower house of the Parliament of India from New Delhi as a member of the Indian National Congress. Banerjee death was announced in 1991.

References

External links
Official biographical sketch in Parliament of India website

1925 births
1990s deaths
Indian National Congress politicians from Delhi
Lok Sabha members from Delhi
India MPs 1971–1977
Politicians from Varanasi
Women members of the Lok Sabha